Charles Scott Luxmoore (1794–1854) was an Anglican priest.

The son of John Luxmoore, a bishop, Charles Scott Luxmoore was educated at Eton and St John's College, Cambridge. From 1826 to 1854 he was  Dean of St Asaph.

He married on 10 September 1829, Katherine, daughter of Rev. Sir John Nicholl, Dean of the Arches, of Merthyr Mawr, Glamorgan.  They had one son, John Nicholl Luxmoore (1830-1849) who died young following a horse riding accident.
 
Charles died at Cradley, Herefordshire on 27 April 1854 and he is buried at St Asaph Cathedral. The Clerical Journal marked his death as that of "another gigantic pluralist":

Notes

External links

National Archives

1794 births
1854 deaths
People educated at Eton College
Alumni of St John's College, Cambridge
Deans of St Asaph